DTV may refer to:
 Dealer Team Vauxhall, a motorsport organisation
 Democracy (video platform), formerly known as DTV
 Deer tick virus
 Dialog TV, a satellite television company in Sri Lanka
 Digital television
 Direct-to-video, a model for distributing motion pictures directly to home video formats
 DirecTV, a satellite television company in the United States
 DreamWorksTV, stylized as "Dtv"
 D-TV, music videos produced by Walt Disney Productions
 DTV (Moldovan TV channel)
 DTV (RTÉ), a television channel owned and operated by Radio Telefís Éireann
 dtv Verlagsgesellschaft, a German publishing house
 Dziennik Telewizyjny, chief news program of communist Poland until 1989, also known as DTV or DT
 German Transport Workers' Union, former German trade union